Alejo Avello is a main researcher at CEIT-IK4 Technological Center (since 1992) and a professor at Tecnun-School of Engineering, University of Navarra (since 1992) where he lectures in mechanical engineering.

He has been Ceit-Ik4’ director from 2000 to 2017 and dean of Tecnun from 2008 to 2012.

Avello's expertise is mainly focused on advanced powder metallurgy and laser manufacturing. He is currently involved on research projects for local and global companies.

References

External links
CEIT Official Website
Tecnun Official Website
University of Navarra Official Website

Further reading
Alejo Avello interviewed by Madr+id R&D magazine

Living people
Spanish scientists
Deans (academic)
Spanish engineers
Spanish academic administrators
Year of birth missing (living people)